Hector's goby (Koumansetta hector) is a species of goby native to the Indian Ocean (including the Red Sea) to the islands of Micronesia in the western Pacific Ocean. This species reaches a length of  SL. It can also be found in the aquarium trade. The specific name honours Gordon Hector (b. 1918) who was Chief Secretary to the Government of the Seychelles, in gratitude for his help to Smith's work in the Seychelles.

References

External links
 

Hector's goby
Hector's goby